This was the first edition of the tournament.

Steve Darcis won the title after defeating Thiago Monteiro 3–6, 6–2, 6–0 in the final.

Seeds

Draw

Finals

Top half

Bottom half

References
 Main Draw
 Qualifying Draw

Open Sopra Steria de Lyon - Singles
2016 Singles